Respironics is an American medical supply company owned by Philips that specializes in products that improve respiratory functions. It is based in the Pittsburgh suburb of Murrysville in Pennsylvania, United States.

History
In 1976, company founder Gerald McGinnis opened the company's first manufacturing facility for anesthesia masks near Pittsburgh, Pennsylvania. Previous product research and manufacturing had occurred in the founder's kitchen. Other early products included endotracheal and tracheostomy products.

The company introduced the first continuous positive airway pressure (CPAP) machine for the treatment of sleep apnea in 1985. Three years later, in 1988, the company went public under the stock ticker symbol RESP. In 1992, Respironics received a patent for bi-level technology. This technology was originally intended as an improvement on CPAP, however, its use has expanded into the treatment of other breathing disorders such as chronic obstructive pulmonary disease (COPD).

Other significant milestones were the acquisition of the ventilator company LIFECARE International in 1996, sleep apnea competitor Healthdyne Technologies in 1998, and medical monitor and sensor leader Novametrix in 2002.

On December 21, 2007, Respironics announced it entered into a merger agreement with Philips, with Philips acquiring all shares of Respironics for $66 per share, for a total of approx $5.1 billion. On March 14, 2008, Philips announced completion of tender offer to acquire Respironics.

Today
Philips Respironics's products include devices for the diagnosis and treatment of sleep apnea including CPAP and bi-level (BiPAP) non-invasive ventilation machines, oxygen concentrators for patients requiring supplemental oxygen, infant apnea monitors for infants at risk of SIDS, asthma treatment solutions and hospital ventilators.

References

Need to update your complaint department.

External links
 

Companies based in Pittsburgh
Health care companies established in 1976
Medical equipment
1976 establishments in Pennsylvania
Philips
American subsidiaries of foreign companies